The Rohri Hills in Upper Sindh, Pakistan are scarped rocks of limestone running southeast of Rohri between the Indus river in the west and the Nara river in the east. These hills are home to a large number of archaeological sites. Flint artifacts of the Paleolithic period have been discovered here.

See also
 Aror
 Kot Diji

References

Hills of Sindh